Falcão is a Portuguese surname meaning "falcon". It may refer to:

 Alessandro Rosa Vieira (born 1977), nicknamed Falcão, Brazilian football and futsal player
 Falcão da Silva (born 1981), Brazilian footballer
 Esquiva Falcão (born 1989), Brazilian amateur boxer
 Lucas Falcão (born 1999), Brazilian footballer
 Paulo Roberto Falcão (born 1953), former Brazilian footballer
 Richard Falcão (born 1987), Brazilian footballer
 Marcondes Falcão Maia (born 1957), Brazilian singer
 Maiquel Falcão (1981–2022), Brazilian MMA Fighter
 Radamel Falcao (born 1986), Colombian footballer
 Yamaguchi Falcão (born 1987), Brazilian amateur boxer

Portuguese-language surnames